Much Like Falling is an EP by Flyleaf. This album was released digitally onto the iTunes Store on October 30, 2007. It includes unreleased songs not featured on their self-titled album. This EP was released onto the iTunes Store the same day as their re-release of their self-titled album, Flyleaf. The Much Like Falling EP was also released to select record stores for free in celebration of Record Store Day on April 19, 2008.

Track listing

Personnel
Flyleaf
 Lacey Mosley – lead vocals
 Sameer Bhattacharya – lead guitar
 Jared Hartmann – rhythm guitar
 Pat Seals – bass guitar
 James Culpepper – drums, percussion

Production
 Produced and recorded by Mark Lewis and Flyleaf. (Except where noted.)
 Mixed by Joe West. (Except where noted.)

References

2007 EPs
Flyleaf (band) albums
A&M Octone Records EPs